Elytroleptus luteus is a species of beetle in the family Cerambycidae. It was described by Dugès in 1879.

References

Elytroleptus
Beetles described in 1879